Mount Tranchant is a small mountain or hill directly on the west coast of Graham Land. The feature marks the south side of the terminus of Wiggins Glacier. First charted by the French Antarctic Expedition, 1908–10, under J.B. Charcot who gave the descriptive name "Mont Tranchant" (sharp mountain or edge mountain).

Mountains of Graham Land
Danco Coast